Alonso de Briceño, O.F.M. of Alonso de Brizeño (1587 – 16 November 1668) was a Roman Catholic prelate who served as Bishop of Caracas (Santiago de Venezuela) (1653–1668)
and Bishop of Nicaragua (1644–1653).

Biography
Alonso de Briceño was born in Santiago, Chile in 1587 and ordained a priest in the Order of Friars Minor. He served as Guardian of the Convent of Lima. On 28 July 1644, he was selected by the King of Spain and confirmed by Pope Paul III on 14 November 1644 as Bishop of Nicaragua. On 12 November 1645, he was consecrated bishop by Hernando de Ramírez y Sánchez, Bishop of Panamá; and installed in December 1645. On 18 August 1653, he was appointed during the papacy of Pope Julius III  as Bishop of Caracas, Santiago de Venezuela. He never traveled to Caracas to take possession of the see; instead travelling to Trujillo, Peru where he died on 16 November 1668.

Episcopal succession
While bishop, he was the principal consecrator of:
Payo Afán Enríquez de Ribera Manrique de Lara, Bishop of Santiago de Guatemala (1658) and 
Bernardo de Izaguirre de los Reyes, Bishop of Panamá (1659).

References

External links and additional sources
 (for Chronology of Bishops) 
 (for Chronology of Bishops) 
 (for Chronology of Bishops) 
 (for Chronology of Bishops) 

17th-century Roman Catholic bishops in Nicaragua
17th-century Roman Catholic bishops in Venezuela
Bishops appointed by Pope Paul III
Bishops appointed by Pope Julius III
1597 births
1668 deaths
Franciscan bishops
Roman Catholic bishops of León in Nicaragua
Roman Catholic bishops of Caracas